Trichophysetis preciosalis is a moth in the family Crambidae. It is found on La Réunion.

References

Cybalomiinae
Moths described in 1996
Moths of Africa